Uttiya was an early monarch of Sri Lanka of the kingdom of Anuradhapura, based at the ancient capital of Anuradhapura from 267 BC to 257 BC.The death of Arahat Mahinda (who had brought Theravāda Buddhism to Sri Lanka) was occurred in king Uttiya's reign period

See also
 List of Sri Lankan monarchs

External links 
 Kings & Rulers of Sri Lanka
 Codrington's Short History of Ceylon

Monarchs of Anuradhapura
U
 Sinhalese Buddhist monarchs
3rd-century BC Sinhalese monarchs
U